Christina Zedell (born 1960) is a Swedish social democratic politician and ombudsman. She has been a member of the Riksdag since 2006.

External links
Christina Zedell at the Riksdag website

Members of the Riksdag from the Social Democrats
Living people
1960 births
Women members of the Riksdag
21st-century Swedish women politicians
Members of the Riksdag 2006–2010
Members of the Riksdag 2010–2014